The Parti Bumi Kenyalang ( meaning "Land of the Hornbill Party") is a Sarawakian centre-right political party and officially registered in 2013 and have its headquarters in Bintulu and also in Kuching.

The party's stated intent is to establish a just, equal, progressive, stable and harmonious society and serve as a platform for Sarawakians to express their concerns about issues affecting the state and safeguard the concerns and autonomy of Sarawak.

It also seeks to push for a review of the status of the rights of Sarawak using the Malaysia Agreement and the Cobbold Commission report as its basis. Parti Bumi Kenyalang is the only political party currently working on the concept of "In Quest of Independence"  which is gaining support from Sarawak people.

As a pro-independence political party, Parti Bumi Kenyalang will seek freedom and independence for Sarawak by constitutional and legal means under domestic and international law based on inalienable right of self-determination mentioned in United Nations Assembly Resolutions 1514 and 1541 from the federation of Malaysia once it becomes the Sarawak Government.

Electoral history

The party made its electoral debut in the 2018 general election by contesting the Sarikei parliamentary seat but only managed to garner 392 votes resulting in the loss of the candidate's deposit. For 2022 general election, PBK has agreed with Parti Sarawak Bersatu to jointly use PSB's logo.

Leadership structure

PBK Supreme Council (2022–2025) 
 Permanent Chairman:
 Yu Chin Liik
 Deputy Permanent Chairman:
 Yii Sie Tung
 President:
 Voon Lee Shan
 Deputy President:
 Peli Aron
 Vice President:
 Dr. Richard Ibuh
 Saharuddin Abdullah
 Vice President (Women):
 Jamie Tiew Yen Houng 
 Vice President (Youth):
 Linang Chapum
 Secretary General:
 Priscilla Lau
 Deputy Secretary General:
 Olivia Lim Wen Sia
 Treasurer:
 Eric Ngieng
 Organising Secretary:
 Leslie Ting
 Deputy Organising Secretary:
 Stevenson Joseph
 Publicity Secretary:
 Arthur Wong
 Deputy Publicity Secretary:
 Devora Chung
 Public Relations:
 Andy Yek
 Deputy Public Relations:
 Alex Woo
 Ordinary Members:
 Awang Badele
 Dr. Stephen Sungan
 Ang Hui Lee
 Lai Chii Chuan
 Ting Ung Sii
 Voon Hian Ting
 Kasim Mana
 Iskandar Sukarno
 Agatha Wong
 Lau Chii Tiing
 Dr. Petrus Bulan
 Michelle Ling
 Charlie Genam
 Baha Iman
 Mary Rita
 Atet Dego 
 Patrick K. K. Teo
 Salleh Mahali
 Zanuddin Budug
 Riyah Basrah
 Usup Asun
 Desmond Gani Pengiran
 Leighton Manjah
 Yunus Basri
 Chieng Kung Chiew

General election result

State election results

External links
  on PBK_Facebook-Live
  on PBK_website
  on Voice_Of_Kenyalang

References

Political parties established in 2013
Political parties in Sarawak
Pro-independence parties
2013 establishments in Malaysia
Separatism in Malaysia